Efisio Arru (Siligo, 1927 – Sassari, 2000) was an Italian scientist, from Sardinia. He graduated from the  Veterinary Faculty of the University of Sassari in 1957, and in 1978 was appointed Professor of Parasitology at that university.  Efisio Arru played a role in the study of parasitology in Italy, in particular the study and the fight against   Echinococcus.

References

1927 births
2000 deaths
Italian biologists
People from Siligo
Academic staff of the University of Sassari
20th-century Italian scientists
20th-century biologists
University of Sassari alumni